Close Combat: First to Fight is a squad-based military first person tactical shooter video game created by Destineer Studios for Microsoft Windows, Macintosh and Xbox. It was released in April 2005. The player commands a fireteam of three U.S. Marines in a realistic fictional, scenario where the United Nations sends Marines into Lebanon when their Prime Minister falls ill and Syria and Iran send forces to bolster certain factions.

The game features a psychological model for every AI character, including enemies, civilians, and team members. No two games should play the same due to the variability of the simulated human reaction to stress.

It was designed with input from active-duty and retired Marines from 3rd Battalion 1st Marines, who recently participated in combat around Fallujah, Iraq during Operation Phantom Fury that became known as the Second Battle of Fallujah.

Gameplay

Plot
The player takes on the role of a U.S. Marine Corps lance corporal with the callsign Gladiator 2. The Lebanese Prime Minister becomes ill, and must temporarily leave office to recover. Seeing a prime chance to control Lebanon, Syria and Iran begin supplying local militant groups. As things escalate, Marines are inserted into Beirut for the third time.

Enemy factions
Militia: The militia are a group of former Lebanese army personnel working together with Syrian troops. They are led by Akhbar al-Soud, a former army officer and arms dealer.
Atash Movement: The Atash movement is an organisation of extremist Islamists, supported by Iran. They are led by Tarik Qadan, a powerful Muslim cleric, who may be a puppet of the Iranian government.
Syrian Army: The Syrian Army occupies a large part of Beirut, and is equipped with heavy weapons and APCs. They are led by General Bakr, a former Yemeni army officer and suspected terrorist.
Iranian special forces: A small group of highly trained commandos, working with the Atash. They are led by Adullah bin Katan, an army Major and terrorist supporter.

Reception

The PC and Xbox versions received "average" reviews according to the review aggregation website Metacritic. Macworld gave the Mac version universal acclaim over a month before its release worldwide.

References

External links
 

2005 video games
2K games
Cooperative video games
MacOS games
MacSoft games
Multiplayer online games
Propaganda video games
Video games about the United States Marine Corps
Video games developed in the United States
Video games set in Lebanon
Wii games
Windows games
Xbox games